Woodville is a hamlet in the town of Ellisburg, Jefferson County, New York, United States.

History
The village of Woodville, St. Croix County, Wisconsin, was named after the hamlet.

Notes

Hamlets in Jefferson County, New York
Hamlets in New York (state)